Ernest Ohemeng (born 17 January 1996) is a Ghanaian footballer who plays as a winger for Spanish club Salamanca CF UDS.

Club career
Ohemeng was a Rio Ave youth graduate. He made his senior debut on 12 April 2014, in a 1–2 Primeira Liga loss against Olhanense; it was his maiden appearance for the club.

On 7 July 2015, Ohemeng and his teammate Emmanuel Boateng made a permanent move to fellow Primeira Liga side Moreirense. After featuring sparingly, he was loaned to Académica de Coimbra and Arouca.

On 3 August 2018, Ohemeng signed a two-year deal with CD Mirandés in the Spanish Segunda División B. He helped the side achieve promotion to Segunda División, but appeared rarely during his two-year spell at the club.

On 29 July 2020, Ohemeng joined Salamanca CF UDS in the third division.

References

External links

1996 births
Living people
Footballers from Accra
Ghanaian footballers
Association football wingers
Primeira Liga players
Liga Portugal 2 players
Rio Ave F.C. players
Moreirense F.C. players
Associação Académica de Coimbra – O.A.F. players
F.C. Arouca players
Segunda División players
Segunda División B players
CD Mirandés footballers
Salamanca CF UDS players
Ghanaian expatriate footballers
Ghanaian expatriate sportspeople in Portugal
Ghanaian expatriate sportspeople in Spain
Expatriate footballers in Portugal
Expatriate footballers in Spain